Light Grenades is the sixth studio album by alternative rock band Incubus, released on November 28, 2006, on Epic. The album sold 359,000 copies during its first week of release worldwide, and debuted at No. 1 on the Billboard 200, selling 165,000 copies in the US in its first week; it is the band's first number one album. However, until November 20, 2016, Light Grenades held the dubious honor of having the title of the biggest drop from No. 1 in chart history, falling to number 37. The album achieved Gold certification, less than the band's previous Platinum records beginning with 1999's Make Yourself.

History
"Earth to Bella" and "Love Hurts" made their live debut in front of an audience at the Make Some Noise concert on April 29, 2006.

"A Kiss to Send Us Off" and "Anna Molly" made their live debut on VH1's Decades Rock: Live Tribute to the Pretenders on August 11, 2006, even though the songs were not featured in the program. The same two songs were also performed at Edgefest 2006 on September 30 at Tempe Beach Park, Arizona.

"Rogues" made its debut at a pair of pre album-release shows at the London Astoria and the Berlin Postbahnhof on November 14 and 16, 2006.

The songs "Punch Drunk" and "Look Alive" were recorded during the Light Grenades sessions, but were originally only available as bonus tracks on the Japanese edition of the album. Live versions have since seen release worldwide on the Look Alive live DVD. The studio versions of both songs are also on Monuments and Melodies.

Musical style
Mike Einziger, Incubus' guitarist, commented in an interview with MTV that the album "sounds like 13 different bands playing 13 different songs... Every time we're about to start making a new album, I tell myself, 'Okay, this one's going to be cohesive,' and it never happens."
For the most part, Light Grenades expands upon the sounds previously explored in 2004's A Crow Left of the Murder....

Other songs showcase a new direction for the band. For example, Brandon Boyd describes the curious recording technique behind "Paper Shoes": "There's a song called 'Paper Shoes' where Michael and I mic'd our bodies with ambient mics and did the percussion tracks pounding on our chests and skulls. The galloping rhythm is us pounding on our chests. It was really funny. We were trying so hard not to laugh because we were sitting there like cavemen beating our chests!"

Themes
When asked about the album title, Boyd explained: "There's a song called that on the record and it felt like the most pertinent conceptual aspect of the album, the idea of throwing ideas at problems and the ideas explode with light and good results and intention on consciousness. So I started imagining imagery of students in different countries protesting and throwing Molotov cocktails with masks over their faces. But there's one brave student who runs up to the police line and, as opposed to throwing rocks or things that destroy, there's this concept of that one courageous, lonely student running up and throwing ideas and having them actually change things. It just seemed kind of a cool concept: the redefining of weaponry."

Critical reception

At Metacritic, which assigns a rating determined by a "weighted average" of reviews from mainstream critics, the album received a score of 65 out of 100, based on 13 reviews, indicating "generally favourable reviews". However, Beats per Minute later identified this album as the start of Incubus' decline in quality that continued with later, softer releases such as If Not Now, When? (2011).

Jon Foreman of IGN praised the single "Dig" in his December 2006 review, but also noted, "Incubus is not limited to poppy, commercially viable tracks like this; tracks that can be (and have been) the downfall of other, less forward thinking bands. With influences from Faith No More to Ani DiFranco, the almost schizophrenic range they have established for themselves counts wholeheartedly on the fact that fans and critics alike realize that the varying genres they incorporate into their music  one another with credible aplomb. In other words, they would not be able to make a track like 'Dig' work on the album without  tracks like 'Pendulous Threads' or 'Light Grenades'".  Mike Schiller of PopMatters wrote in January 2007, "Boyd sounds as Patton-esque in his modern rock operatics as ever, and the band has perfected the transition from studio-friendly perfectionists to intentionally messy well-produced garagers." He further adds, "Incubus has never made a perfect album — no, not even S.C.I.E.N.C.E. — and Light Grenades, truth told, is far from perfect. 'A Kiss to Send Us Off' sounds a little too much like it’s aping Foo Fighters, both 'Earth to Bella' tracks sound forced and disjoint, and there’s still a little too much in the way of faceless middle-of-the-road rock ‘n roll. Even so, there’s not a single track on Light Grenades that’s truly revolting."

Joe Crofton of MusicOMH considered it to be an improvement over A Crow Left of the Murder.... He wrote in his November 2006 review, "I wasn’t expecting much, and on the first hearing I thought my theory had been proved right. Incubus had devolved into a boring sell-out, pandering soft pop-rock to young girls. However, when I removed my sceptics glasses and opened my eyes I began to realise that there is so much more to this record. These are actual songs, in the vein of Make Yourself and the better half of Morning View. Whatever teething problems they may have been experiencing with new bassist Ben Kenney, it all seems to have been resolved."

Track listing

Release history

Personnel

Incubus
Brandon Boyd – lead vocals, percussion, guitar
Mike Einziger – guitar, piano, rhodes, string arrangements, additional engineering, engineering and mixing on "Quicksand"
Ben Kenney – bass, backing vocals
Chris Kilmore – turntables, hammond B3, minimoog voyager, rhodes, mellotron, piano, marxophone, theremin
Jose Pasillas – drums

Assistant engineers
Tom Syrowski 
Matt Serricchio 
Glen Pittman 
Kevin Mills 
Tom Tapley

Others
Brendan O'Brien – producer, mixing
Nick DiDia – engineer
Billy Bowers – additional engineering
Suzi Katayama – strings conductor
Bob Ludwig – mastering

Singles
"Anna-Molly" – was briefly available online on September 20. It was slated for release on October 16, and debuted at No. 19 on Billboards Modern Rock Tracks chart. "Anna-Molly" peaked at No. 1 on the Modern Rock chart, at No. 4 on the Mainstream Rock Tracks chart and at No. 66 on the Billboard Hot 100. The song is featured in the music video game Guitar Hero: On Tour.
"Dig" is the second single from Light Grenades. The video for the single was chosen from a pool of applicants in a fan-film contest. The song is featured in the music video game Lego Rock Band.
"Oil and Water" was the third US single.  It was released to radio stations on June 5, 2007, and climbed to No. 8 on the Modern Rock chart.
"Love Hurts" was released as the third single in some international markets. It was released as the fourth US single in October 2008, 16 months after "Oil and Water".
"Light Grenades" is used on the soundtrack of the Xbox 360 game Project Gotham Racing 4.

Charts

Weekly charts

Year-end charts

Singles

Certifications

References

2006 albums
Incubus (band) albums
Epic Records albums
Albums produced by Brendan O'Brien (record producer)
Albums with cover art by Alan Aldridge